La Banda Timbiriche: En Concierto or simply En Concierto is the third album from Mexican pop music group Timbiriche. It was released in 1983.

Background and production
After the release of two studio albums in 1982 and a TV special that were well received, the group went on their first international tour and soon started selecting songs for the new album to come. One of the selected songs was Mickey's version of the song Mickey by Tony Basil. The track was chosen because it was one of the most popular in the tour's performances. After a break from the shows to perform their final exams at school, the group returned to the studio to record the song and then promote it on TV. The album marks the debut of new member Erik and to promote the album a TV special was made called "La Banda Timbiriche en concierto".

Commercial reception
The group won the cover of the magazine Notitas Musicales from May 15, 1983 due to the group's success that year. According to the magazine, En Concierto was gold-certified.

Track listing
Source:

References

1983 albums
Timbiriche albums